Augusta, officially Augusta–Richmond County, is a consolidated city-county on the central eastern border of the U.S. state of Georgia. The city lies across the Savannah River from South Carolina at the head of its navigable portion. Georgia's third-largest city (after Atlanta and Columbus), Augusta is located in the Fall Line section of the state.

According to the U.S. Census Bureau, Augusta–Richmond County had a 2020 population of 202,081, not counting the unconsolidated cities of Blythe and Hephzibah. It is the 116th-largest city in the United States. The process of consolidation between the City of Augusta and Richmond County began with a 1995 referendum in the two jurisdictions. The merger was completed on July 1, 1996. Augusta is the principal city of the Augusta metropolitan area. In 2020 it had a population of 611,000, making it the second-largest metro area in the state (after Atlanta) and the 9th most populous urban center in the Deep South. It is the 95th-largest metropolitan area in the United States.

Augusta was established in 1736 and is named in honor of Princess Augusta of Saxe-Gotha (1719–1772), the bride of Frederick, Prince of Wales and the mother of the British monarch George III. During the American Civil War, Augusta housed the principal Confederate Powderworks. Augusta's warm climate made it a major resort town of the Eastern United States in the early and mid-20th century. Internationally, Augusta is best known for hosting The Masters golf tournament each spring. The Masters brings over 200,000 visitors from around the world to the Augusta National Golf Club. Membership at Augusta National is widely considered to be the most exclusive in the sport of golf around the world.

Augusta lies approximately two hours away from downtown Atlanta by car via I-20. The city is home to Fort Gordon, a major U.S. Army base. In 2016, it was announced that the new National Cyber Security Headquarters would be based in Augusta.

History

The area along the river was long inhabited by varying cultures of indigenous peoples, who relied on the river for fish, water and transportation.  The site of Augusta was used by Native Americans as a place to cross the Savannah River, because of its location on the fall line.

In 1735, two years after James Oglethorpe founded Savannah, he sent a detachment of troops to explore the upper Savannah River. He gave them an order to build a fort at the head of the navigable part of the river. The expedition was led by Noble Jones, who created a settlement as a first line of defense for coastal areas against potential Spanish or French invasion from the interior. Oglethorpe named the town in honor of Princess Augusta, the mother of King George III and the wife of Frederick, Prince of Wales. Oglethorpe visited Augusta in September 1739 on his return to Savannah from a perilous visit to Coweta Town, near present-day Phenix City, Alabama. There, he had met with a convention of 7,000 Native American warriors and concluded a peace treaty with them in their territories in northern and western Georgia. During the American Revolutionary War, the Siege of Augusta resulted in the retaking the city from the British by the Americans. Augusta was the second state capital of Georgia from 1785 until 1795 (alternating for a period with Savannah, the first).

Augusta developed rapidly as a market town as the Black Belt in the Piedmont was developed for cotton cultivation. Invention of the cotton gin made processing of short-staple cotton profitable, and this type of cotton was well-suited to the upland areas. Cotton plantations were worked by slave labor, with hundreds of thousands of slaves shipped from the Upper South to the Deep South in the domestic slave trade. Many of the slaves were brought from the Lowcountry, where their Gullah culture had developed on the large Sea Island cotton and rice plantations.

During the Civil War, Augusta was home to many war industries including powder-works facilities. After the war, Augusta had a booming textile industry leading to the construction of many mills along the Augusta Canal to include Enterprise Mill, Sibley Mill, and King Mill.

The city experienced the Augusta Fire of 1916, which damaged 25 blocks of the town and many buildings of historical significance.

As a major city in the area, Augusta was a center of activities during Reconstruction and after. In the mid-20th century, it was a site of civil rights demonstrations. In 1970, Charles Oatman, a mentally disabled teenager, was killed by his cellmates in an Augusta jail. A protest against his death broke out in a riot involving 500 people, after six black men were killed by police, each found to have been shot in the back. The noted singer and entertainer James Brown was called in to help quell lingering tensions, which he succeeded in doing.

Hyde Park 
In 1993, an area known as Hyde Park in Augusta, Georgia, was investigated by the EPA for contamination. The investigation totaled $1.2 million. Air, groundwater, and soil were all believed to be contaminated, and people living in the area were hoping for government assistance to move away from Hyde Park. Two of five neighborhoods in Hyde Park appeared to have arsenic, chromium, and dioxin, while all five were found to have PCBs and lead. However, residents were told it was not a risk to their health unless they somehow ingested it on a regular basis. At the time the article was written, the citizens still questioned why the EPA and ATSDR (Agency for Toxic Disease Registry) did not consider these chemicals as a threat to them. Hyde Park also has higher rates of certain illnesses (such as cancer, infections, rashes) than the average in America, and the citizens question why that is not considered.

Geography
The city is located at  (33.4700, −81.9750).

Augusta is located about halfway up the Savannah River on the fall line, which creates a number of small falls on the river. The city marks the end of a navigable waterway for the river and the entry to the Georgia Piedmont area.

The Clarks Hill Dam is built on the fall line near Augusta, forming Clarks Hill Lake. Farther downstream, near the border of Columbia County, is the Stevens Creek Dam, which generates hydroelectric power.  Even farther downstream is the Augusta Diversion Dam, which marks the beginning of the Augusta Canal and channels Savannah River waters into the canal.

Climate
As with the rest of the state, Augusta has a humid subtropical climate (Köppen Cfa), with short, mild winters, very hot, humid summers, and a wide diurnal temperature variation throughout much of the year, despite its low elevation and humidity. Snowfall is not nearly as common as in Atlanta, due largely to Augusta's elevation, with downtown Augusta being about  lower than downtown Atlanta. The heaviest recorded snowfall was in February 1973 with 14.0″ snowfall (35.56 cm) Freezing rain is also a threat in wintertime.

Historic districts

Augusta Downtown Historic District is a historic district that encompasses most of downtown Augusta and its pre-Civil War area. It was listed on the National Register of Historic Places in 2004.

Augusta also includes the:
Bethlehem Historic District
Broad Street Historic District
Greene Street Historic District
Harrisburg–West End Historic District
Laney–Walker North Historic District
Paine College Historic District
Pinched Gut Historic District
Sand Hills Historic District
Summerville Historic District

Tallest buildings

Demographics

2020 census

As of the 2020 United States census, there were 202,081 people, 66,838 households, and 41,517 families residing in the city.

2013
According to 2013 US Census estimates, the Augusta–Richmond County population was 197,350  not counting the unconsolidated cities of Hephzibah and Blythe. In the 2010 census, Augusta–Richmond County had 195,844 residents. The racial makeup of the city-county area was 64.7% Black or African American, 29.1% White, 0.3% Native American, 1.7% Asian, 0.2% Pacific Islander, 1.3% some other race, and 2.6% from two or more races. Hispanic or Latino people of any race were 4.1% of the population.

There were 75,208 households, out of which 28.0% had children under the age of 18 living with them, 35.2% were headed by married couples living together, 22.7% had a female householder with no husband present, and 37.1% were non-families. 30.7% of all households were made up of individuals, and 8.8% had someone living alone who was 65 years of age or older. The average household size was 2.46 and the average family size was 3.09.

In the city-county consolidated area the population was spread out, with 24.6% under the age of 18, 12.6% from 18 to 24, 26.7% from 25 to 44, 24.8% from 45 to 64, and 11.3% who were 65 years of age or older. The median age was 33.0 years. For every 100 females, there were 93.8 males. For every 100 females age 18 and over, there were 90.7 males.

As of the 2000 census, the median income for a household in the city-county area was $37,231, and the median income for a family was $45,372. Males had a median income of $32,008 versus $23,988 for females. The per capita income for the balance was $19,558. About 13.2% of families and 16.8% of the population were below the poverty line, including 24.1% of those under age 18 and 12.5% of those age 65 or over.

Religion
The most-attended denomination is the Southern Baptist Convention, with 221 congregations and 114,351 members. The Catholic Church has 13 congregations and 31,687 members, while the United Methodist Church has 83 churches and 30,722 members. The National Baptist Convention had 26,671 members. The Presbyterian Church (USA) has 14 congregations and 4,500 members, the Presbyterian Church in America has 4,396 members in 14 churches.

The Jewish community in Augusta dates back to the early 19th century.  Today, there are two congregations: Congregation Children of Israel (Reform) and Adas Yeshurun (Conservative).  There is also a Chabad-Lubavitch house.  Around 1,300 Jews currently live in Augusta, who collectively support a Jewish Community Center.

Economy
Augusta is a regional center of medicine, biotechnology, and cyber security. Augusta University, the state's only public health sciences graduate university, employs over 7,000 people. Along with University Hospital, the Medical District of Augusta employs over 25,000 people and has an economic impact of over $1.8 billion.

The city's three largest employers are Augusta University, the Savannah River Site (a Department of Energy nuclear facility) and the U.S. Army Cyber Center of Excellence at Fort Gordon, which oversees training for Cyber, Signal Corps, and Electronic Warfare. Despite layoffs from several companies during the U.S. economic recession and a relatively high state unemployment rate, the Augusta community has experienced a decrease in bankruptcy filings and saw a slight decrease in the unemployment rate from late 2009 to March 2011. However, these unemployment numbers are misleading as spring brings lower unemployment rates due to the Masters Golf Tournament. While unemployment fell to a two-year low of 8.3% in April 2011, unemployment rates have since risen to 9.9% as of July 2011.

With the establishment of the Georgia Cyber Center in Downtown Augusta, the Augusta metro region has become a hub for cyber security based companies looking to locate to the area in part as well to the establishment of the U.S. Army Cyber Command relocating to Fort Gordon from Fort Meade. Augusta plays host to TechNet on a yearly basis which brings in various military, government, and private sector leaders to the area to showcase new cyber related products as well as discussions on cyber based collaboration efforts between the public and private sectors.

Companies that have facilities, headquarters or distribution centers in the Augusta metro area include CareSouth, NutraSweet, T-Mobile, Covidien, Solo Cup Company, Automatic Data Processing, Graphic Packaging International, Solvay S.A., Bridgestone, Teleperformance, Olin Corporation, Sitel, E-Z-GO, Taxslayer, Elanco, KSB Company (Georgia Iron Works), Club Car (Worldwide Headquarters), Halocarbon, MTU Friedrichshafen (subsidiary of Tognum), Kimberly Clark Corporation, Nutrien (formerly PotashCorp), John Deere, Kellogg's and Delta Air Lines' baggage call center.

Top employers
According to the Augusta Economic Development Authority, the top manufacturing employers in the city are:

The top public sector employers are:

Sports

Teams
The Augusta GreenJackets minor league baseball club, formerly located at Lake Olmstead Stadium in Augusta, now play at SRP Park along the Savannah River in North Augusta, South Carolina. The team began to play in 1988 as the Augusta Pirates, affiliated with the Pittsburgh Pirates. Later affiliated with the Boston Red Sox and the San Francisco Giants, the GreenJackets are now the Class A affiliate of the Atlanta Braves.

The Augusta Lynx were a minor-league professional ice hockey team based in Augusta, Georgia. The Lynx played their home games at the James Brown Arena from 1998 until 2008. The Lynx, who played in the ECHL, had affiliations with the Tampa Bay Lightning of the NHL and the Norfolk Admirals of the AHL.

The Augusta RiverHawks were a professional minor league ice hockey team. They played in the Southern Professional Hockey League (SPHL) from 2010 to 2013. They played their home games at the James Brown Arena.

The Augusta Stallions were a professional Arena football team founded in 1999. They were one of the 15 original teams to join the inaugural 2000 AF2 season. They started off in the American Conference, before switching to the Southeast Division in 2001, and then the Eastern Division in 2002. The team folded in 2002.

The Augusta Rugby Football Club (ARFC) is a division 2 men's club competing in the Palmetto Rugby Union, part of the USA Rugby South Conference.

Augusta has an all-female flat track roller derby team, the Soul City Sirens. Founded in 2008, this league is all-volunteer and skater-owned.

Augusta is also home to the former Augusta 706ers, a minor league professional basketball team in the American Basketball Association. The team was founded in 2017 and stopped operations in December 2018 because of a lack of funds. The team played all home games at the James Brown Arena.

Tournaments

The city's famous golf course, the Augusta National Golf Club, hosts the first major golf tournament of each year, The Masters. This tournament is the most prestigious in the sport and is one of the four major championships. The best professional and amateur golfers in the world come to Augusta during the first full week of April every year. The grounds of Augusta National are known for being pristine, and the course was ranked in 2009 as the third best golf course in the world by Golf Magazine.

The city also has several disc golf facilities. The Augusta Top Gun Series is a series of tournaments sanctioned by the Professional Disc Golf Association. These tournaments are held at various venues in Augusta, including Pendleton King Park and Lake Olmstead. Also, Augusta hosted the 2006 Professional Disc Golf World Championships. Along with Pendleton King and Lake Olmstead, two courses in North Augusta, SC was used for the tournament. 299 disc golfers from around the world attended the event, with Ken Climo winning the tournament and his 12th world championship.

Augusta hosted the Augusta Southern Nationals billed as "World's Richest Drag Boat Race" for 30 consecutive years. The event was held on the Savannah River near downtown in July until 2016. The race was part of the Lucas Oil Drag Boat Racing Series and was sanctioned by the International Hot Boat Association.

Augusta is the site of the Head of the South Regatta. The youth rowing regatta is held on the Savannah River and is usually scheduled for early November.

Augusta is also the host to one of the largest IRONMAN 70.3 competition in North America taking athletes through various cycling routes around Augusta, a running course through Downtown Augusta, and an opening swim on the Savannah River along Augusta's riverfront. Recently, Augusta has been the featured home of the USA Cycling Collegiate Road National Championships which leads cyclists through various routes through Downtown Augusta and Fort Gordon. The city has also attracted visitors during the Nike EYBL Peach Jam Basketball Tournament held in neighboring North Augusta, South Carolina which features some of the top high school basketball players and teams across the United States.

Parks and recreation
Riverwalk Augusta – riverfront park along and on top of the city's levee
Augusta Common – green space linking Broad Street to Reynolds Street, with statue of James Oglethorpe
Augusta Canal – historic canal with bike/pedestrian path
Phinizy Swamp Nature Park – wetlands park with pedestrian/bike paths and boardwalks
Diamond Lakes Regional Park – in south Richmond County
Brookfield Park – public park featuring a playground, putting green, pedestrian/bike path, and a fountain in which children can play
Pendleton King – public park featuring a disc golf course, dog park, amphitheater, bike and running paths, and gardens

Law and government
In 1995, citizens of Augusta and unincorporated parts of Richmond County voted to consolidate their city and county governments. Citizens of Hephzibah and Blythe, also located in Richmond County, voted against joining in the merger, which took effect January 1, 1996. The unified government consists of a mayor and ten commissioners. Eight commissioners represent single-member districts, while two are elected at-large, each to represent a super district that encompasses half of Augusta-Richmond's population.
Law enforcement in Augusta is handled by the Richmond County Sheriff's Office which patrols the main city of Augusta and the unincorporated areas of Hephzibah  and Blythe although both of these towns have their own police departments. Prior to consolidation, Augusta had a city police department and the Richmond County sheriff patrolled the unincorporated areas of the county. The consolidation charter deems the sheriff as the chief law enforcement officer of Richmond County. Augusta is one of the few consolidated city-counties in the state that retain the sheriff in a law enforcement capacity.

List of mayors 
See List of mayors of Augusta, Georgia

Education

Colleges and universities
Main campuses
Augusta Technical College (state technical college)
Augusta University (public research university)
Paine College (private, Methodist historically black college)

Satellite campuses
East Georgia State College (state four-year college), main campus located in Swainsboro
Georgia Military College (state funded military college), main campus located in Milledgeville
Brenau University (private, not-for-profit, undergraduate and graduate-level higher education), main campus located in Gainesville, Georgia

K–12 schools
Public K–12 schools in Augusta are managed by the Richmond County School System. The school system contains 36 elementary schools, 10 middle schools, and the following eight high schools: Glenn Hills, Butler, Westside, Hephzibah, T. W. Josey, A.R.C. (Academy of Richmond County), Lucy Craft Laney, and Cross Creek. There are four magnet schools: C. T. Walker Traditional Magnet School, A. R. Johnson Health Science and Engineering Magnet High School, Davidson Fine Arts, and the Richmond County Technical Career Magnet School.

Private schools in Augusta include Aquinas High School, Episcopal Day School, Saint Mary on the Hill Catholic School, Immaculate Conception School, Hillcrest Baptist Church School, Curtis Baptist High School, Gracewood Baptist First Academy, Alleluia Community School, New Life Christian Academy, Charles Henry Terrell Academy, Heritage Academy, and Westminster Schools of Augusta. Augusta Christian Schools, Augusta First Seventh-day Adventist School, and Augusta Preparatory Day School serve Augusta, but are located in neighboring Martinez.

Media

The daily newspaper in the city is The Augusta Chronicle.

The television stations are: WAGT (CW Plus and NBC), WCES (PBS), WFXG (Fox), WJBF (ABC and MeTV) and WRDW (CBS).

Transportation

Augusta is linked to Atlanta to the west and Columbia, South Carolina, to the east by Interstate 20 (I-20). I-520 (Bobby Jones Expressway) extends from I-20 exit 196 through Augusta's western and southern suburban areas, eventually crossing the Savannah River to South Carolina, in which it is known as Palmetto Parkway.

U.S. Route 1 (US 1), along with State Route 4 (SR 4), connects Wrens. US 1 also links Augusta with Aiken, South Carolina. US 25 and SR 121 connects Waynesboro with Augusta; across the state line, US 25 and South Carolina Highway 121 (SC 121) links Augusta with Edgefield, South Carolina. US 78/US 278/SR 10, known locally as Gordon Highway, connects Thomson with Augusta. In South Carolina, US 1 and US 78 go through Aiken, South Carolina. US 78 further connects with Charleston, South Carolina. US 278 bypasses Aiken and serves as a connecting route to Hilton Head Island, South Carolina.

Augusta has been mentioned as the east terminus of an proposed expansion of Interstate 14 that would begin in Midland-Odessa, Texas and run through Texas, Louisiana, Mississippi, Alabama, and Georgia with hopes of connecting major military installations along the highway corridor such as Fort Hood, Fort Benning, Fort Gordon, and Camp Beauregard.

Augusta has also been mentioned another proposed interstate known as Interstate 3 that would go through the city from Savannah to Knoxville, Tennessee and it only runs through two states, Georgia, and Tennessee.

Major roads and expressways

 (follows US 1 from Jefferson County line to Gordon Highway; leaves Georgia at James U. Jackson Memorial Bridge)
 (various roads, including John C. Calhoun Expressway and Washington Road)

 in southern Richmond County

Parts of Augusta are served by city transit service Augusta Public Transit (APT), but the main mode of transportation within the city is by car. Augusta is also served by a number of taxi companies.

Airports
The city has two airports: Augusta Regional Airport and Daniel Field. Augusta Regional Airport is served by three passenger airlines, including Delta, which offers mainline service to Atlanta.

Rail
Until the 1960s, the city's Augusta Union Station was a passenger rail hub, with trains arriving from the Atlantic Coast Line (as spur sections from Florence, South Carolina, from trains such as the Champion, Everglades and Palmetto), Georgia Railroad and Southern Railway (for example, the Aiken-Augusta Special from New York City). The last Seaboard Coast Line (the successor to the Atlantic Coast Line) train was a Florence-Augusta section of the Champion; this section ended in 1970. The last train to the city was the unnamed daily in-state Georgia Railroad train between Atlanta and Augusta. This latter train, unofficially called The Georgia Cannonball, ran as a mixed train, until May 6, 1983. Most trains went to the Union Station at Barrett Square. The Southern Railway trains went to the Southern Railway depot at Fifth and Reynolds Street. Today, freight service is handled by Norfolk Southern Railway's Georgia Division and Piedmont Division through their Augusta Yard and Nixon Yard located near the city. Norfolk Southern Trains such as the NS 191 and 192 pass through Augusta's downtown as they "street run" at  down 6th street. They also cross the old Trestle over the Savannah River entering and leaving South Carolina. CSX Transportation Atlanta Division and Florence Division Trains also serve the Augusta, Georgia, area from the CSX Augusta Yard near Gordon Highway southwest of the city.

Pedestrians and cycling

 Augusta Canal Historic Trail
 New Bartram Trail
 Phinizy Swamp Constructed Wetlands Trail
 River Levee Trail
 Riverwalk Augusta Trail

Notable people

Sister cities

Augusta is twinned with:
  Biarritz, Pyrénées-Atlantiques, France
  Takarazuka, Hyōgo, Japan

See also

Arts and culture in Augusta, Georgia
James Brown Arena
List of mayors of Augusta, Georgia
List of people from Augusta, Georgia
Media in Augusta, Georgia
Medical District (Augusta, Georgia)
Old Government House (Augusta, Georgia)
Summerville (Augusta, Georgia)
List of U.S. cities with large Black populations
USS Augusta, 3 ships

Notes

References

Further reading
 Allen, Carrie. "“I Got That Something That Makes Me Want to Shout”: James Brown, Religion, and Gospel Music in Augusta, Georgia." Journal of the Society for American Music 5.4 (2011): 535-555. online
 Allen, Carrie A. " 'When We Send Up the praises': Race, Identity, and Gospel Music in Augusta, Georgia." Black Music Research Journal (2007): 79-95. online; also online at JSTOR
 Bellamy, Donnie D., and Diane E. Walker. "Slaveholding in Antebellum Augusta and Richmond County, Georgia." Phylon 48.2 (1987): 165-177 online; also online in JSTOR.
 Brown, Russell K. "Post-Civil War Violence in Augusta, Georgia." Georgia Historical Quarterly 90.2 (2006): 196-213 online.
 Brown, Russell K. "Augusta's Other Voice: James Gardner and the Constitutionalist." Georgia Historical Quarterly 85.4 (2001): 592-607 online.
 Cashin, Edward J., and Glenn T. Eskew, eds. Paternalism in a Southern City: Race, Religion, and Gender in Augusta, Georgia (U of Georgia Press, 2001).
 Curtis, William S. "Unorthodox British Technology at the Confederate Gunpowder Works, Augusta, Georgia, 1862–1865." in Gunpowder, Explosives and the State (Routledge, 2016) pp. 263–272.
 Fleming, Berry. Autobiography of a Colony: The First Half-century of Augusta, Georgia (U of Georgia Press, 2009).
 Gourley, Bruce T. "A Journey of Faith and Community: The Story of the First Baptist Church of Augusta, Georgia." Baptist History & Heritage 51.3 (2016).
 Griffin, Richard W. "The Augusta (Georgia) Manufacturing Company in Peace, War, and Reconstruction, 1847–1877." Business History Review 32.1 (1958): 60–73.
 Herrington, Philip Mills. "Agricultural and Architectural Reform in the Antebellum South: Fruitland at Augusta, Georgia." Journal of Southern History 78.4 (2012): 855-886 online.
 Hutchinson, Glenn, and Maurice R. Brewster. Population Mobility: A Study of Family Movements Affecting Augusta, Georgia, 1899-1939 (Federal Works Agency, Work Projects Administration of Georgia, 1942) online.
 Jones, Charles Colcock. Memorial History of Augusta, Georgia: From Its Settlement in 1735 to the Close of the Eighteenth Century (D. Mason, 1890) online.
 Joiner, Sean, and Gerald J. Smith. Augusta, Georgia (Arcadia Publishing, 2004); Focus on Blacks; heavily illustrated. online
 McCrary, Peyton. "The dynamics of minority vote dilution: The case of Augusta, Georgia, 1945-1986." Journal of Urban History 25.2 (1999): 199–225.
 Sampson, Curt. The Masters: golf, money, and power in Augusta, Georgia (Villard Books, 1999) online.
 Souther, J. Mark. "Making 'The Garden City of the South': Beautification, Preservation, and Downtown Planning in Augusta, Georgia." Journal of Planning History 20.2 (2021): 87-116 online.
 Werner, Randolph D. "The New South Creed and the Limits of Radicalism: Augusta, Georgia, before the 1890s." Journal of Southern History 67.3 (2001): 573-600 online.
 Whites, LeeAnn. Civil War as a Crisis in Gender: Augusta, Georgia, 1860-1890 (University of Georgia Press, 2000).
 Whites, LeeAnn. The Charitable and the Poor: The Emergence of Domestic Politics in Augusta, Georgia, 1860–1880 (KG Saur, 2012).
 Zecher, Sara Elizabeth. "The economic role of universities in medium-sized cities: a case study of the Medical College of Georgia in Augusta, Georgia" (Diss. Georgia Institute of Technology, 2005) online.

External links

Augusta Metropolitan Convention and Visitors Bureau 
Augusta Economic Development Authority homepage
Augusta Tomorrow
Downtown Development Authority
Robert E. Williams Photographic Collection: African-Americans in the Augusta, Ga. Vicinity (Richmond Co.), ca. 1872–1898 from the Digital Library of Georgia
Picturing Augusta: Historic Postcards from the Collection of the East Central Georgia Regional Library

 
Populated places established in 1735
Cities in Georgia (U.S. state)
Georgia
Cities in Richmond County, Georgia
County seats in Georgia (U.S. state)
Census balances in the United States
Augusta metropolitan area
Consolidated city-counties